Seraincourt may refer to the following places in France:

 Seraincourt, Ardennes, a commune in the Ardennes department
 Seraincourt, Val-d'Oise, a commune in the Val-d'Oise department